Boerne Independent School District is a public school district based in Boerne, Texas (USA). Located in Kendall County, portions of the district extend into Bexar and Comal counties. In addition to Boerne, the communities of Fair Oaks Ranch and Scenic Oaks also lie within the district.

Academic Achievement
In the 2021-2022 school year, Boerne ISD received a rating of 'A' from the Texas Education Agency on its A-F scale. The district also received ‘A’ ratings in the 2017-2018 and 2018-19 school years; the TEA did not rate school districts in the 2019-2020 or 2020-21 school year due to the pandemic. Only 1% of schools received an 'A' during all three grading periods.

Schools
In the 2022-2023 school year, the district had students in 14 schools.

High Schools (Grades 9-12)
 Boerne High School
 Samuel V. Champion High School
Middle Schools (Grades 6-8)
 Boerne Middle School North
 Boerne Middle School South
 Capt. Mark Tyler Voss Middle School
Elementary Schools (Grades K-5)
 Cibolo Creek Elementary 
 Curington Elementary
 New Fabra Elementary
 Fair Oaks Ranch Elementary
 Kendall Elementary
 Van Raub Elementary
 Dr. Ferdinand L. Herff Elementary School
Other
 Boerne Academy (Grade 9-12)
 Boerne Alternative School (Grades K-12)
Closed
 Boerne Elementary School
 Fabra Elementary
 Boerne Junior High School
 Old Boerne High School
 Boerne School For Colors

Departments
 Athletics Department
 Business Office
 Communications Office
 Curriculum & Instruction
 Custodial Department
 Facilities and Construction Department 
 Food Services
 Health Services
 Human Resources
 Maintenance Department
 Special Education
 Technology Services
 Transportation Department
 Warehouse

Awards and honors 
In 2014, both Boerne High School and Boerne Champion High School were among 500 schools in the nation listed on Newsweek's Top High Schools in America.

In 2020, HEB's Excellence in Education Awards named BISD as the Best Small School District in Texas.

In 2022, the International Center for Leadership in Education named the district one of eight Innovative Districts in the United States.

As of 2022 US News had BISD's high schools, Champion HS and Boerne HS, ranked #141 and #211 in Texas respectively.

See also

 List of school districts in Texas
 List of high schools in Texas

References

External links 
 

School districts in Kendall County, Texas
School districts in Bexar County, Texas
School districts in Comal County, Texas
School districts established in 1907